Kary Fajer (born 23 June 1953, in Mexico D.F., Mexico), is a Mexican television writer, mostly for Mexican media company, Televisa. She is well known for being the head writer of telenovelas for the producer Nicandro Díaz González.

Fajer's most successful telenovelas include: Carita de ángel, ¡Vivan los niños!, La indomable, Simplemente María, Gotita de amor, Contra viento y marea, Destilando amor, Mañana es para siempre, Soy tu dueña, Amores verdaderos y Hasta el fin del mundo.

Filmography

Adaptations 
 El Bienamado (2017) Original of Dias Gomes with Ximena Suárez
 Approach and Synopsis Hasta el fin del mundo (2014/2015) Original of Enrique Estevanez with Gabriela Ortigoza
 Amores verdaderos (2012/2013) Original of Marcela Citterio and Enrique Estevanez with Gerardo Moon, Alejandro Orive, Ximena Suárez, Julián Aguilar, Alberto Gómez
 Soy tu dueña (2010) Original of Inés Rodena with Gerardo Moon, Alejandro Orive, Alejandro Pohlenz. 
 Mañana es para siempre (2008/2009) Original of Mauritius Navas and Guillermo Restrepo with Gerardo Moon
 Destilando Amor (2007) Original of Fernando Gaitán with Gerardo Moon
 First part of Contra viento y marea (2005) Original of Manuel Muñoz Rico with Gabriela Ortigoza
 ¡Vivan los niños!! (2002/03) Original of Abel Santa Cruz with Gerardo Moon and Calú Gutierrez.
 Carita de Ángel (2000/01) Original of Abel Santa Cruz with Alberto Gómez
 First part of Rosalinda (1999) Original of Delia Fiallo with Carlos Romero and Liliana Abud
 Gotita de amor (1998) Original of Raymundo López
 The children of anybody (1997) Original of Miguel Known
 The last hope (1993) Original of Abel Santa Cruz
 Some chapters of Simplemente María (Mexican telenovela) (1989/90) Original of Celia Alcántara
 The indomable (1987) Original of Hilda Moral Allois

Additional dialogues 
 Second part of Prisoner of love (1994) Original Inés Rodena
 Half part of Valentina (1993)in the second part with Inés Rodena

Prizes and nominations

Premios TVyNovelas

References 

Mexican dramatists and playwrights
Mexican women writers
Writers from Mexico City
20th-century Mexican women
21st-century Mexican women
1953 births
Living people